Prince Charming is the third album by and final credited to Adam and the Ants (future albums would be credited to Adam Ant), released in November 1981. This album features bass player Gary Tibbs in place of Kevin Mooney, the bassist on Kings of the Wild Frontier. The album included the band's two number one UK hit singles "Stand and Deliver" and "Prince Charming" as well as "Ant Rap".

The album peaked at number 2 in the UK charts and received mixed reviews from critics.

The track "Five Guns West" appears unrelated to the Roger Corman film Five Guns West.

Release 

Prince Charming was released in November 1981 by CBS Records. The album spawned the two UK number 1 singles "Stand and Deliver" (with a different ending from the single version) and "Prince Charming", which reached number 1 in April and September 1981 respectively, and "Ant Rap" which reached number 3 in January 1982 when it was remixed.

The album was remastered and reissued in 2004 with six bonus demo tracks. On 10 September 2008, the Daily Mail gave away a CD copy of Prince Charming with the newspaper.

Reception 

Writing in Smash Hits magazine in November 1981, Ian Birch gave the album 5 out of 10 and commented "Gone are the strong melodies that made Kings of the Wild Frontier so addictive; in are elaborate details (the intros are the highpoint here)... The surface might be glossily busy but it's no substitute for good songs." In his retrospective review, AllMusic's Stephen Thomas Erlewine wrote that "the songs just aren't there", stating that it "simply has style and sound – which, in retrospect, isn't all that bad", while Rolling Stone called it "exactly the same album [as Kings of the Wild Frontier], except with a blue cover." Trouser Press called it "a letdown" and that "much of the LP seems forced, ill-tempered and silly."

Alleged plagiarism 

The song "Prince Charming" employs strong musical influences in common with Rolf Harris' 1965 song "War Canoe", and in March 2010 Harris claimed on BBC Radio 5 Live's Danny Baker Show that an out-of-court settlement had been reached and a large sum of royalties received after a musicologist had found the two songs to be musically identical. "Prince Charming" producer Chris Hughes has stated that Harris withdrew his complaint "with a bit of a giggle" when Adam Ant pointed out that both tracks borrowed heavily from a recording of an old Maori 'War Canoe'-type song.

Track listing 

Note: Some releases have "Prince Charming" as track 1 and "Scorpios" as track 3.

Personnel
 Adam and the Ants

 Adam Ant – vocals, bass, harmonica
 Marco Pirroni – guitar
 Merrick – drums, production, acoustic guitar on "Prince Charming"
 Terry Lee Miall – drums
 Gary Tibbs – bass

 Technical
 Ross Cullum – engineering

Chart positions

In popular culture 
Posters promoting the album are plastered across a wall in the 2008 première episode of Ashes to Ashes, signaling Alex Drake's arrival in 1981.

References

External links 

 

Adam and the Ants albums
1981 albums
Epic Records albums
Albums produced by Chris Hughes (musician)